The 2014 NAIA Division II Men's Basketball national championship was held in March at Keeter Gymnasium in Point Lookout, Missouri. The 21st annual NAIA basketball tournament featured thirty-two teams playing in a single-elimination format. The championship game was won by Indiana Wesleyan of Marion, Indiana over Midland University of Fremont, Nebraska by a score of 78 to 68.

Tournament field
The 2014 tournament field was announced March 5, 2014. The field featured defending champion and top seed Cardinal Stritch University as well as runner-up William Penn University. Two conferences, the Crossroads League and The Sun Conference garnered four bids apiece, while four other conferences received three bids each. The field included five first-time attendees: Cincinnati Christian University,  Northern New Mexico College from Española, New Mexico, Northwest Christian University from Eugene, Oregon,  Reinhardt University of Alpharetta, Georgia and Southeastern University of Lakeland, Florida.

College of the Ozarks, who received an automatic bid as the host team, leads the field in total invitations with eighteen, while Bethel College of Mishawaka, Indiana leads the field with three national championships. Defending national champion Cardinal Stritch of Milwaukee, Wisconsin earned an automatic berth as regular-season champions out of the Chicagoland Collegiate Athletic Conference, the Wolves eleventh championship appearance overall and fifth-straight. They entered the championship as the top ranked team in each of the last seven Coaches' Polls.

Highlights

First round
The first round was fairly typical, with higher seeded teams winning most games with only a couple of exceptions.  Unseeded William Penn from Oskaloosa, Iowa and sixth seed Dordt College of Sioux Center, Iowa played a memorable double-overtime game. The teams combined for two hundred and thirty-four points, besting the old mark for most combined points in a game (two hundred twenty-two) set by Cornerstone University from Grand Rapids, Michigan and Bethel in 1999.  With less than a minute in the second overtime, Kelly Madison hit a step-back three to put the William Penn Statesmen on top one hundred eighteen to one hundred sixteen for the win over the Defenders. Madison recorded the tournaments highest individual scoring performance with thirty-eight points while teammate Alex Schwab scored twenty-seven. Blake Walker managed a triple-double with ten points, eleven rebounds and ten assists. For Dordt, Austin Katje put in thirty-three points, tying for the third most three-pointers made with eight and three-pointers attempted with eighteen. Nathan Rindels tallied a triple-double as well, with twenty-one points, eleven rebounds and fourteen assists. Two other Defenders, Kyle Lindbergh (twenty, ten) and Dalton Franken (twenty-five, ten) achieved double-doubles. Dordt played the entire second overtime with just one starter (Lindbergh) on the floor due to fouls.

The Thursday evening session began with the first overtime game of the day as Demarko Nash of Robert Morris hit a three-pointer with two seconds left in regulation put the game into overtime. Robert Morris continued to defeat number fourteen Saint Francis sixty-nine to sixty-three.
The big upset of the day came as the Bobcats from host school College of the Ozarks shot sixty-one per cent from the field while using their home-court advantage and huge games from junior Alex Santiago and Nathan Simniok  to upset the number two-seeded College of Idaho Yotes.  In another close game, St Thomas Bobcats’ guard Kevin Hincapie knocked down a three-pointer from the left win as time expired to propel his team to victory over Union.

Second round
While the first round was quiet, the second round of the 2014 tourney was filled with upsets as the three remaining top-four seeds went down. Unseeded Southeastern University from Lakeland, Florida, led by a twenty-nine point, eight for eight from the field (four for four from beyond the arc) performance by Jake Hodges,  needed a three pointer from Dwayne Johnson with two tenths of a second left to take down top seed and defending champion Cardinal Stritch.  After ten lead changes in the last eight minutes, Stritch had a two-point lead with less than five seconds remaining. Johnson brought the ball the length of the floor and fired a three at the buzzer for a one-point Fire win.

In spite of a twenty-one point performance by Vernon Payne, the unseeded Robert Morris Eagles made a 7-0 run to finish the game and eliminated the three seed Indiana University Southeast Grenadiers, 71-66. Fourth seeded Cornerstone met their match in unseeded Friends. Friends came out shooting and cruised to an eighteen-point lead behind NAIA player of the year Joe Mitchell, ultimately winning the game seventy-nine to sixty-nine.  When the round was over, the only seeded teams remaining were number five Indiana Wesleyan, number nine Davenport, and number ten, Midland.

Elite Eight
After scoring two-hundred and twenty-two points in the first two rounds, the William Penn Statesmen's run was brought to an end by Robert Morris (Illinois) in a seventy-nine to seventy-eight contest. The Statesmen scored the first eight points of the game, but the Eagles turned to Harry Singh off the bench for three three-pointers and Jarrell Turner for a two to gain the lead at 29-28. William Penn regained the lead on a three by Demarko Nash and held a narrow lead until layups by Blake Walker and Alec Schwab brought the margin to one point with just over a minute left. Neither team was able to score for the rest of the contest, leaving Robert Morris to advance to the Fab Four by virtue of a one-point victory.  First-time guest Southeastern continued its run of victories over higher-seeded teams with a three-point win over Davenport, while the Indiana Wesleyan Wildcats continued its streak of double-digit wins with a ninety-five to seventy-nine win over Friends.  The fourth semifinal position was claimed by the Midland Warriors with a seventy-six to seventy win over three-time champion Bethel College.

Fab Four
As befits a tournament of upsets, three of the four teams were in their first-ever Fab Four appearance. In the first semifinal game, Indiana Wesleyan took off to an early lead over the Southeastern Fire. A Jake Hodges free throw for Southeastern tied the game at eight, but IWU answered right back and never trailed again, although the Fire would pull back within three just before the half on a layup by Dana Thomas. Indiana Wesleyan used disciplined offense and unrelenting defense to gradually pullaway to a ninety-eight to seventy-seven victory. Jordan Weidner scored twenty-nine points for the Wildcats and was joined in double figures by brothers R.J. Mahurin and Lane Mahurin, Nathan Bubash and Zac Vandewater. For the Fire, Dwayne Johnson led with 28 points, followed by Hodges and Thomas with eleven and Timothy Mitchell with ten.

On the other half of the bracket, Midland recorded an impressive one hundred to sixty-one shellacking of Robert Morris.  In what was to become the widest Fab Four margin of victory in tournament history, Midland jumped to a sixteen to two lead over Robert Morris just three minutes into the game. Ben Imig led Midland with twenty-seven points, while Alex Starkel and Galen Gullie added fourteen and thirteen respectively. Jarrel Turner led Robert Morris with fourteen points while Sean Montgomery added ten points. Courtney Bell grabbed eleven boards for Robert Morris.

Championship game
The fifth-seeded Indiana Wesleyan Wildcats became the first team in the history of the tournament to win all of its contests by double digits as they defeated the Midland Warriors by ten points for the crown. IWU never trailed in the game, building a ten-point lead just seven minutes into the game. Midland closed to within one point on a three pointer by Avery Langford, but baskets by Zac Vandewater and Lane Mahurin quickly put IWU back up by five. In the second half, Indiana Wesleyan took control, ultimately winning the game by a score of seventy-eight to sixty-eight. Jordan Weidner led the Wildcats in scoring with twenty-one. He was joined in double figures by RJ Mahurin with nineteen, Lane Mahurin with eleven and Zac Vandewater with ten. Vandewater led all teams in rebounding with ten. For Midland, Ben Imig led in scoring with seventeen, along with a team leading six assists. He was closely followed by Franklin Marcus with fifteen and Alex Starkel with ten. Starkel added nine rebounds, while Brandon Williams grabbed seven.

Tourney awards and honors
Dr. James Naismith/Emil Liston Team Sportsmanship Award: Indiana Wesleyan

Individual recognition
Most Outstanding Player: Jordan Weidner, Indiana Wesleyan
Championship Hustle Award: Lane Mahurin, Indiana Wesleyan
NABC/NAIA Division II Coach of the Year: Greg Tonagel, Indiana Wesleyan
Rawlings-NAIA Division II National Coach of the Year: Todd Eisner, Midland
2014 NAIA Division II Men's Basketball All-Championship Team
Joe Mitchell-Friends (Kan.)
Dwayne Johnson-Southeastern (Fla.)
Tim Mitchell-Southeastern (Fla.)
Dominez Burnett-Davenport (Mich.)
RJ Mahurin-Indiana Wesleyan
Ben Imig-Midland (Neb.)
Galen Gullie-Midland (Neb.)
Jarrell Turner-Robert Morris (Ill.)
Alec Schwab-William Penn
Kelly Madison-William Penn

Statistical leaders

(minimum 4 games)

Bracket

  * denotes overtime.

Epilogue
Only two players who made it to the tournament Fab Four, Jordan Weidner of Indiana Wesleyan (who was named the tournaments Most Outstanding Player), and Dwayne Johnson of Southeastern were named to the NAIA All-America team.  The post-season coaches poll on the other hand was heavily influenced by the outcome of the tournament, as Indiana Wesleyan and Midland wound up in first and second place respectively, while Southeastern and Robert Morris wound up third and fifth. Cardinal Stritch fell to fourth in the rankings. Indiana Wesleyan head coach Greg Tonagel was honored as the NABC Division II Men's Basketball Coach of the Year and Todd Eisner of Midland (Neb.) was named the NAIA Division II Men's Basketball Coach of the Year. Mitchell Wiggins of Southeastern was drafted by the Harlem Globetrotters.

NAIA Division II Men’s Basketball All-America Teams

See also
2014 NAIA Division I men's basketball tournament
2014 NCAA Division I men's basketball tournament
2014 NCAA Division II men's basketball tournament
2014 NCAA Division III men's basketball tournament
2014 NAIA Division II women's basketball tournament

References

NAIA Men's Basketball Championship
Tournament
2014 in sports in Missouri